The Wunderino-Arena (formerly known as Ostseehalle) is an indoor arena, in Kiel, Germany. It is primarily used by THW Kiel (team handball) and as a venue for rock/pop concerts. It holds up to 13,500 people.

History
Construction was determined in 1950 by the Kiel council meeting. The Osteseehalle was initiated on 17 June 1951, during the Kiel Week and was eventually finished in 1952. For this purpose, the steel construction of a retired airplane hangar, from an airbase on the island Sylt, was dismantled and brought to Kiel.

Over the course of decades, the arena was constantly redeveloped, and since renovations finished in September 2001, it is now "prepared for the next 50 years", according to the operators. On 1 January 2008, the Sparkassen-Finanzgruppe purchased the naming rights. On 1 July 2020, the name changed to Wunderino Arena.

On 16 April 2002, Irish vocal pop band Westlife held a concert for their World of Our Own Tour supporting their album World of Our Own.

See also
List of indoor arenas in Germany

References

External links

  
 Portrait of the Sparkassen-Arena

Sports venues in Schleswig-Holstein
Handball venues in Germany
Indoor arenas in Germany
Buildings and structures in Kiel